Nuvole barocche is an album released by Italian singer/songwriter Fabrizio De André. It is a compilation of tracks from his first singles (which appear for the first time on LP) and from two of his LPs: Tutto Fabrizio De André and Volume 1.

Track listing

 "Nuvole barocche" (De André, Gianni Lario, Carlo Stanisci) (2:26)
 "E fu la notte" (De André, Franco Franchi, Carlo Stanisci) (2:03)
 "Valzer per un amore" (Gino Martinuzzi, De André) (2:35)
 "Per i tuoi larghi occhi" (2:33)
 "La Canzone dell'Amore Perduto" (3:40)
 "Carlo Martello ritorna dalla battaglia di Poitiers" (De André, Paolo Villaggio) (5:19)
 "Il fannullone" (De André, Paolo Villaggio) (3:37)
 "Geordie" (traditional) (2:04)
 "Delitto di paese" (Georges Brassens, translation by De André) (3:52)

All songs written by Fabrizio De André, except where indicated.

1969 compilation albums
Fabrizio De André albums
Italian-language compilation albums